Cotylea is a suborder of free-living marine turbellarian flatworms in the order Polycladida.

Families 
 Boniniidae Bock, 1923
 Cestoplanidae Lang, 1884
 Chromoplanidae Bock, 1922
 Dicteroidae Faubel, 1984
 Diposthidae Woodworth, 1898
 Ditremageniidae Palombi, 1928
 Euryleptidae Stimpson, 1857
 Opisthogeniidae Palombi, 1928
 Amyellidae Faubel, 1984
 Pericelidae Laidlaw, 1902
 Prosthiostomidae Lang, 1884
 Pseudocerotidae Lang, 1884
 Theamatidae Marcus, 1949

References

External links 

Turbellaria